Ariel Mosór (born 19 February 2003) is a Polish professional footballer who plays as a centre-back for Piast Gliwice.

Club career 
Born in Katowice, Poland, Ariel Mosór went through the ranks of Unia Warszawa, before joining Legia Warsaw in 2018.[1] He played his first professional match on 15 July 2020, during an Ekstraklasa away nil draw against Lechia Gdańsk.[2][3] This allowed him to win his first title, as a 2020 Polish champion.[4]

 On 9 June 2021, Piast Gliwice announced the signing of Mosór on a three-year deal, with the option to extend the contract for another 12 months.[5]

Personal life
His father, Piotr Mosór, was also a professional football player.

Honors

Club

Legia Warsaw
Ekstraklasa: 2019–20

References

External links
 

2003 births
Living people
Sportspeople from Katowice
Polish footballers
Poland youth international footballers
Poland under-21 international footballers
Association football defenders
Legia Warsaw II players
Legia Warsaw players
Piast Gliwice players
Ekstraklasa players
III liga players